Mohammed Baroot (Arabic:محمد باروت) (born 7 June 1987) is an Emirati footballer. He currently plays for Masfout as a goalkeeper.

External links

References

Emirati footballers
1987 births
Living people
Al-Ittihad Kalba SC players
Dibba Al-Hisn Sports Club players
Al Bataeh Club players
Masafi Club players
Masfout Club players
Association football goalkeepers
UAE First Division League players
UAE Pro League players